Sidney Arthur Wallace is a former rear admiral in the United States Coast Guard.

Biography
Wallace was born on October 16, 1927 in Alcoa, Tennessee. He graduated from Baylor School in Chattanooga, Tennessee in 1945, the George Washington University Law School in 1968 and Auburn University in 1969.

Wallace married Jacqueline Theis of Islip, New York. The couple had two children.

Career
Wallace graduated from the United States Coast Guard Academy in 1949. He was then assigned to the USCGC Mendota (WHEC-69) and the USCGC Finch (WDE-428).

After completing flight training, Wallace became a search and rescue pilot at Coast Guard Air Station San Francisco in 1953. He would later be stationed at Coast Guard Air Station Kodiak, Coast Guard Air Station Elizabeth City and Naval Air Station Barbers Point.

In 1968, Wallace enrolled at the Air War College. After graduating the following year, he assumed command of Coast Guard Air Station New Orleans.

From 1975 to 1977, Wallace was Chief of Public and International Affairs. He then became the first Executive Director of the Maritime Safety Task Force in the Office of the United States Secretary of Transportation.

Awards he received during his career include the Meritorious Service Medal, the Coast Guard Commendation Medal, the World War II Victory Medal and the National Defense Service Medal.

References

People from Alcoa, Tennessee
People from Chattanooga, Tennessee
United States Coast Guard admirals
United States Coast Guard Academy alumni
George Washington University Law School alumni
Auburn University alumni
Air War College alumni
1927 births
Living people